David M. Schroeder (born 1937) is a former American football coach.  He served as the head football coach at Sioux Falls College—now known as the University of Sioux Falls—from 1978 to 1982, Evangel College—now known as Evangel University—from 1983 to 1988, Lindenwood University from 1990 to 1991, and Westmar University from 1992 to 1995, compiling a career college football coaching record of 72–94–3.  Schroeder was the first head football coach at Lindenwood, serving for two seasons, from 1990 to 1991, and tallying a mark of 11–8–1.  He resigned from his post at Westmar in December 1995 to join his wife in St. Charles, Missouri. Schroeder graduated from Wisconsin State College–Stevens Point—now known as the University of Wisconsin–Stevens Point—with a bachelor's degree in 1964 and earned a master's degree at the Northern Michigan University in 1971.

Head coaching record

College

Notes

References

1937 births
Living people
Evangel Crusaders football coaches
Lindenwood Lions football coaches
Sioux Falls Cougars football coaches
Westmar Eagles football coaches
High school football coaches in Wisconsin
Northern Michigan University alumni
University of Wisconsin–Stevens Point alumni
Sportspeople from Oshkosh, Wisconsin